Lorillard Tobacco Company was an American tobacco company that marketed cigarettes under the brand names Newport, Maverick, Old Gold, Kent, True, Satin, and Max. The company had two operating segments: cigarettes and electronic cigarettes.

The company was purchased by Reynolds American, a company owned by British American Tobacco, in 2014.

History 

The company was founded by Pierre Abraham Lorillard in 1760. In 1899, the American Tobacco Company organized a New Jersey corporation, called the Continental Tobacco Company, that took a controlling interest in many small tobacco companies. By 1910, James Buchanan Duke controlled Lorillard and the American Tobacco Company, even though Lorillard kept its original name. In 1911, the U.S. Court of Appeals found the American Tobacco Company "in restraint of trade",  and issued a Dissolution Decree to the American Tobacco Company, which created the opportunity for Lorillard to become an independent company again. In the same year, Lorillard purchased the Murad brand.

In 1925, Lorillard underwent great transition after Benjamin Lloyd Belt became president. Having been with the company since 1911, Belt made some decisions that made the company profitable. He began to prioritize on promoting the Old Gold brand instead of Beech-Nut chewing tobacco, using such tactics as Old Gold on Broadway and sponsoring "Old Gold Presents Paul Whiteman and His Orchestra" which was a weekly hour-long show on Tuesdays nights over CBS from station WABC in New York. The Whiteman Hour had its first broadcast on February 5, 1929, and continued until May 6, 1930.  When the Whiteman band went to Hollywood in mid-1929 to make the film King of Jazz, Old Gold leased a special eight-coach train to take Whiteman and his entourage to the West Coast. The train stopped at sixteen cities across the nation. Old Gold later sponsored Artie Shaw's Tuesday night "Melody and Madness" program on CBS Radio from November 20, 1938, until November 14, 1939. Belt was still president when he died in 1937.

Lorillard Tobacco Company opened a new cigarette plant on East Market Street in Greensboro, North Carolina in 1956, moving cigarette manufacturing from Jersey City, New Jersey and Richmond, Virginia.

Between 1952 and 1956, the Lorillard 'Kent Microlite' brand used a crocidolite asbestos filter, made by the Hollingsworth & Vose company, which later resulted in millions of dollars being paid to the relatives of their employees and customers who had died, or who were dying, of cancer.

Loews Corporation purchased Lorillard in 1968.

Testifying under oath before Congress in 1994, Lorillard's CEO Andrew Tisch said that he did not believe that nicotine was addictive nor that cigarette smoking caused cancer.

In 1997, the firm's headquarters moved to Greensboro from New York City. The firm also manufactured cigarettes in Louisville, Kentucky.

In 1997, Lorillard was one of four entities to initiate negotiations leading to the 1998 Tobacco Master Settlement Agreement between "Big Tobacco" and 46 U.S. states.

Loews created the Carolina Group as a holding company for its tobacco assets in 2002; it proceeded to sell a minority stake in Carolina on the New York Stock Exchange. Carolina was controlled by Loews until May 10, 2006, when Loews Corporation sold 15 million shares of Carolina Group, lowering its holding from a controlling 53.7% to a plurality 46.3%. The sale was valued at approximately $740 million.

In 2006, Lorillard was convicted of racketeering under RICO, along with Philip Morris and R. J. Reynolds Tobacco Company. The Supreme Court has upheld the verdict, in which Judge Kessler wrote,

In 2008, Lorillard Tobacco was entered into a separation agreement with its parent company Loews, and became an independent publicly traded company.

In order to comply with FDA regulations, Lorillard had until June 22, 2010, to rebrand tobacco products marketed as "Lights", "Ultra-Lights", "Medium", "Mild", "Full Flavor", or similar designations to belie the false impression that some tobacco products are comparatively safe.

In December 2010, a Boston jury returned a $151 million verdict against Lorillard Tobacco Company for giving out free samples of cigarettes to children in urban housing projects in the 1950s. The plaintiff, Marie Evans, was nine when she first received these samples, according to documents filed by her attorneys. She died of lung cancer before trial.

In 2014, after negotiations with People for the Ethical Treatment of Animals (PETA), Lorillard announced it would no longer test its products on animals. In a statement, the company said it "will use scientifically accepted or validated alternative test methods and technologies that avoid the use of animals. Such methods and tests may include in vitro cell culture tests, advanced chemistry tests and computer modeling programs."

Electronic cigarettes
In April 2012, Lorillard purchased privately held electronic cigarette company, blu eCigs, for $135 million in cash, marking the first foray by the tobacco industry into the electronic cigarette market. The electronic cigarette company had about $30 million in revenue in 2010, with blu eCigs sold in more than 13,000 retail outlets, including Walgreens and Sheetz.

In October 2013 Lorillard acquired UK e cig company SKYCIG, which it later rebranded to blu ecigs UK.

Acquisition by Reynolds
In July 2014, Reynolds Tobacco Company agreed to buy Lorillard for $27.4 billion. The deal also included the divestiture of brands Kool, Winston, Maverick, Salem, and blu to Imperial Tobacco for $7.1 billion. The deal was finalized on June 12, 2015.

Old Gold Cigarette Camp

Camp Old Gold was one of the American Army “Cigarette Camps” established near Le Havre, France in World War II. As explained in "Introduction: The Cigarette Camps" at the Web site, The Cigarette Camps: The U.S. Army Camps in the Le Havre Area:

Restatement 
In May 2003, the company restated its financial statements in 2002 to reflect an adjustment to the company's historical accounting for CNA's investment in life settlement contracts and the related revenue recognition. On May 3, 2005, Loews Corp, the holding company of Carolina Group, announced to restate results for prior years to correct CNA's accounting for several reinsurance contracts.

See also
 Lorillard Tobacco Co. v. Reilly, 533 U.S. 525 (2001)
 B. F. Good & Company Leaf Tobacco Warehouse
 David H. Miller Tobacco Warehouse
 111 First Street

References

External links

  (archived, 15 Dec 2013)

 
Companies formerly listed on the New York Stock Exchange
Tobacco companies of the United States
Companies based in Greensboro, North Carolina
2014 mergers and acquisitions